John Everett (born September 10, 1954) is an American rower. He competed in the men's eight event at the 1976 Summer Olympics.

References

External links
 

1954 births
Living people
American male rowers
Olympic rowers of the United States
Rowers at the 1976 Summer Olympics
Sportspeople from Salem, Massachusetts
Pan American Games medalists in rowing
Pan American Games gold medalists for the United States
Rowers at the 1975 Pan American Games
World Rowing Championships medalists for the United States